The 2002–03 football season was Plymouth Argyle Football Club's 99th consecutive season as a professional club. It began on 1 July 2002, and concluded on 30 June 2003, although competitive games were only played between August and May.

Season summary
The club began the 2002–03 season in the Football League Second Division, following their promotion from the Third Division. They finished in a creditable 8th position, with a record of 17 wins, 14 draws, and 15 defeats, from 46 games. Their leading goalscorer was Marino Keith with 12 goals in all competitions. The club reached the Third Round of the FA Cup, drawing 2–2 at home with Dagenham & Redbridge before losing the replay 2–0. They entered the League Cup at the First Round stage and were eliminated away to Crystal Palace 2–1 after extra-time. They also competed in the Football League Trophy where they reached the Second Round before being defeated 2–0 at home by Brentford. Notable players to begin their careers with the Pilgrims this season included David Norris, Tony Capaldi, Hasney Aljofree, and Nathan Lowndes.

Legend

Football League

League table

Pld = Matches played; W = Matches won; D = Matches drawn; L = Matches lost; GF = Goals for; GA = Goals against; GD = Goal difference; Pts = Points

FA Cup

First Round

Second Round

Third Round

Third Round Replay

Football League Cup

First Round

Football League Trophy

Southern Section First Round

Southern Section Second Round

Players

First-team squad
Squad at end of season

Left club during season

Statistics

Appearances and goals
Key

# = Squad number; Pos = Playing position; P = Number of games played; G = Number of goals scored;  = Yellow cards;  = Red cards; GK = Goalkeeper; DF = Defender; MF = Midfielder; FW = Forward

Statistics do not include minor competitions or games played for other clubs. All players who were provided a squad number during the 2002–03 season are included.

Transfers
In

Out

Loans
In

Out
In

Notes

References

Plymouth Argyle F.C. seasons
Plymouth Argyle